is a Japanese idol singer, model, and actress. She is a member of Nogizaka46 and an exclusive model for CanCam magazine. Her acting roles include the supporting role of Mami Ichinose in the BS TV Tokyo series Cheers to Miki Clinic, the lead role of Mai Kamio in the 2019 TV Tokyo adaptation of Video Girl Ai, and the lead role of Reiko Nonoyama in the 2021 TV Tokyo drama The Other Woman.

Early life 
Yamashita was born on July 26, 1999 in Tokyo. Her entertainment career began in 2016 when she successfully auditioned for the third generation of the idol group Nogizaka46. Yamashita and her fellow third generation members performed their first full live concert in May 2017.

Career

Nogizaka46 

Yamashita's first selection for Nogizaka46's main performance group came in March 2018, when she was selected for Nogizaka46's twentieth single "Synchronicity". She has since been selected for the main performance groups for several more of the group's singles, including the twenty-first single "Jikochu de Ikō!" and twenty-second single "Kaerimichi wa Tōmawari Shitaku Naru". Yamashita served as the choreographic center for Nogizaka46's 26th single "Boku wa Boku o Suki ni Naru", released in January 2021. 

Yamashita became an exclusive model for the fashion magazine CanCam in August 2018, joining her fellow Nogizaka46 member Sayuri Matsumura as a CanCam model. Yamashita's first photobook, titled Wasurerarenai Hito (lit. Unforgettable Person), was published by Shogakukan in January 2020. The photobook sold over 100,000 copies in the first week after publication, and ranked first in weekly sales in the Oricon photobook and general book categories. She has also been selected to appear with other Nogizaka46 members in advertising campaigns for Mouse Computer, 7-Eleven, Fanta, Pokémon Go, and Cup Star.

Acting 

Yamashita made her acting debut in 2018 with a minor role in the film Every Day a Good Day, an adaptation of Noriko Morishita's essay about finding happiness through the Japanese tea ceremony. Two stage roles followed, with Yamashita appearing in a stage adaptation of Sailor Moon alongside fellow Nogizaka46 members, and in the horror play Zambi alongside several members of Nogizaka46 and Keyakizaka46. In 2019, after reprising her Zambi stage role for the Nippon TV adaptation of the play, Yamashita played the supporting role of nurse Mami Ichinose in the 2019 BS TV Tokyo ensemble drama , an adaptation of the novel of the same name by mystery writer Mikito Chinen. 

Her first lead role came in the TV Tokyo series . The series continued TV Tokyo's previous live-action adaptation of the manga Video Girl Ai, which starred Nanase Nishino as Ai, but focused on a new main character, Mai Kamio, played by Yamashita. Later that year she joined the cast of the live-action film adaptation of the manga Eizouken ni wa Te o Dasu na! alongside fellow Nogizaka46 members Asuka Saitō and Minami Umezawa. Yamashita played the lead role of Reiko Nonoyama in the 2021 TV Tokyo drama , which was originally conceived by Yasushi Akimoto. 

Yamashita also continued playing supporting roles. In the NHK asadora Maiagare! she played Kurumi Mochizuki, a friend of the protagonist Mai since childhood, with Saki Ōno playing Mochizuki as a child and Yamashita playing Mochizuki as an adult. She joined the cast of the 2023 Fuji TV live-action adaptation of the manga Stand Up Start as Yoshino Haga, a conscientious bank employee.

Works

Theater

Films

Television

Photobooks

References 

1999 births
Living people
21st-century Japanese actresses
Actresses from Tokyo
Japanese female models
Japanese women singers
Japanese film actresses
Japanese idols
Japanese television actresses
Nogizaka46 members